The Lucha Underground Trios Championship was a professional wrestling world tag team championship promoted by Lucha Underground. In contrast to usual tag team championships for two wrestlers, it is exclusively for three-man tag teams, also known as trios in Lucha libre. The titles were announced by the storyline owner of Lucha Underground, Dario Cueto on a show that aired on January 25, 2015, followed by a trios tournament that played out over several episodes of Lucha Underground. The final champions were The Reptile Tribe (Kobra Moon, Daga & Jeremiah Snake).

As it was a professional wrestling championship, the championship was not won not by actual competition, but by a scripted ending to a match determined by the bookers and match makers. On occasion the promotion declares a championship vacant, which means there is no champion then. This can either be due to a storyline, or real-life issues such as a champion suffering an injury being unable to defend the championship, or leaving the company.

History
During Season 1's episode 20 ("The Art of War") storyline owner Dario Cueto announced that he was honoring the lucha libre tradition of the Trios teams as he introduced the Lucha Underground Trios Championship and announced that the Trios title tournament would start on the following show. On Episode 21 ("Uno! Dos! Tres!") the team of Big Ryck, Killshot & Willie Mack defeated the team of Pentagón Jr., Sexy Star & Super Fly. The following week the dysfunctional team of Angélico, Ivelisse & Son of Havoc defeated Aero Star, Drago & Fénix to earn a spot in the finals. In the third week (S1E23 "Fire in the Cosmos") of the tournament Dario Cueto hand-picked the team of King Cuerno, Cage & El Texano Jr. defeated Lucha Underground Champion Prince Puma, Johnny Mundo & Hernandez to earn the third and final spot in the finals. Episode 24, named "Trios Champions" was dedicated almost exclusively to the finals of the Trios tournament. Angélico, Ivelisse & Son of Havoc won the three-way match, which was believed to be the finals. After the match was over Dario Cueto announced that it was only the semi-finals and that the winners had to face "The Crew" (Bael, Mr. Cisco & Cortez Castro) for the championship. The dysfunctional, yet popular team of Angélico, Ivelisse & Son of Havoc won the match, becoming the first holders of the Trios Championship. On the May 24, 2015 episode of Lucha Underground (Episode 28 Shoots and Ladders) the champions were forced to defend the Trios championship against the Crew despite Ivelisse being injured and in a cast. The match was a Ladder match and ended with Ivelisse climbing the ladder despite her injury to claim the belts and a successful title defense. On Episode 30 ("Submit to the Master") the champions had another successful title defense, defeating the team of Big Ryck, Cage & Delavar Daivari. Angélico, Ivelisse & Son of Havoc lost the Trios championship to The Disciples of Death (Barrio Negro, El Sinestro de la Muerte & Trece) as part of the end of the season Ultima Lucha special event. The show was taped on April 19, 2015 and aired for the first time on July 29, 2015.

Title history

Combined reigns

By team

By wrestler

See also
Lucha Underground Championship
Lucha Underground Gift of the Gods Championship

Footnotes

References

Lucha Underground championships
Trios wrestling tag team championships